EAW  may refer to:

 Eastern Acoustic Works, an American manufacturer of audio tools
 European Arrest Warrant, an arrest warrant which is valid throughout the states of the European Union

 Expeditionary Air Wing, a Royal Air Force unit
 Environment Agency Wales, a UK government agency responsible for environmental policy and control in Wales
 Elektro-Apparate-Werke, a former East German manufacturer
Electrical Association for Women, a feminist and educational organisation founded in Great Britain in 1924 to promote the benefits of electricity in the homeq
Extraordinary Attorney Woo, a 2022 South Korean Legal Drama.